Jamie Elliott may refer to:

Jamie Elliott (footballer, born 1973), Australian rules footballer who played in the 1990s 
Jamie Elliott (footballer, born 1992), current Australian rules footballer for Collingwood
Jamie Elliott (golfer), see Northern Texas PGA Championship
Jamie Elliott (rugby union) (born 1992), rugby player for Northampton Saints

See also
James Elliott (disambiguation)